An acinus (plural, acini; adjective, acinar  or acinous) refers to any cluster of cells that resembles a many-lobed "berry," such as a raspberry (acinus is Latin for "berry"). The berry-shaped termination of an exocrine gland, where the secretion is produced, is acinar in form, as is the alveolar sac containing multiple alveoli in the lungs.

Exocrine glands
Acinar exocrine glands are found in many organs, including:
 the stomach
 the sebaceous gland of the scalp
 the salivary glands of the tongue
 the liver
 the lacrimal glands
 the mammary glands
 the pancreas
 the bulbourethral (Cowper's) glands
The thyroid follicles can also be considered of acinar formation but in this case the follicles, being part of an endocrine gland, act as a hormonal deposit rather than to facilitate secretion.
Mucous acini usually stain pale, while serous acini usually stain dark.

Lungs
The end of the terminal bronchioles in the lungs mark the beginning of a pulmonary acinus that includes the respiratory bronchioles,  alveolar ducts, alveolar sacs, and alveoli.

See also

 Alveolar gland
 Intercalated duct

References

External links

Cell anatomy